Events from the year 1924 in Croatia.

Incumbents
 Monarch – Alexander I

Events
January 27 – Treaty of Rome

Arts and literature

Sport
January–February – 1924 Winter Olympics held in Chamonix, in which the Kingdom of Serbs, Croats and Slovenes was represented by a delegation of four sportsmen, including Croats Dušan Zinaja and Mirko Pandaković who competed in cross-country skiing
April 27 – Football club NK Maksimir founded
N/A – Football club NK Vrbovec founded
N/A – Stadion Koturaška football venue opened in Zagreb

Births
January 9 – Mirko Grmek, medical historian (died 2000)
March 30 – Milko Kelemen, composer
June 18 – Nela Eržišnik, actress and comedian (died 2007)
July 4 – Frano Vodopivec, cinematographer (died 1998)
July 22 – Fedor Škubonja, film director (died 2008)
September 5 – Rajka Vali, pop singer (died 2011)
October 29 – Mirko Vidaković, botanist (died 2002)
November 21 – Milka Planinc, politician, served as a Prime Minister of Yugoslavia 1982–1986 (died 2010)

Deaths
October 21 – Viktor Kovačić, architect (born 1874)
N/A – Aleksandar Rakodczay, politician, served as Ban of Croatia 1907–1908 (born 1848)

References

 
Years of the 20th century in Croatia
Croatia